Sūriškiai (also Soriškiai, Soriškis, formerly) is a village in Kėdainiai district municipality, in Kaunas County, in central Lithuania. According to the 2011 census, the village has a population of 13 people. It is located 3 km from Surviliškis, by the regional road  Kėdainiai-Krekenava-Panevėžys, on the right bank of the Nevėžis river. There are some ponds in the former place of sand pit, and some buildings left from the Sūriškiai Manor.

There was the Sūriškiai Manor, where distillery was built in 1859. Later, at the beginning of the 20th century, Sūriškiai was a folwark of the Sirutiškis Manor.

Demography

Images

References

Villages in Kaunas County
Kėdainiai District Municipality